Grant Valley Township is a township in Beltrami County, Minnesota, United States. The population was 2,029 at the 2010 census, up from 1,450 in 2000. Grant Valley Township was named from its location in the valley of Grant Creek.

Geography

The south edge of the city of Wilton is within this township geographically but is a separate entity.

Lakes
 Bootleg Lake
 Fern Lake
 Grant Lake
 Grass Lake (southwest half)
 Larson Lake
 Little Boot Lake
 Miller Lake
 Miss Lake
 Stainbrook Lake
 Stone Lake
 Twin Lakes

Adjacent townships
 Eckles Township (north)
 Northern Township (northeast)
 Bemidji Township (east)
 Helga Township, Hubbard County (southeast)
 Rockwood Township, Hubbard County (south)
 Fern Township, Hubbard County (southwest)
 Jones Township (west)
 Lammers Township (northwest)

Demographics
As of the census of 2000, there were 1,450 people, 526 households, and 405 families residing in the township. There were 552 housing units at an average density of 16.2/sq mi (6.3/km2). The racial makeup of the township was 91.72% White, 0.41% African American, 3.93% Native American, 0.69% Asian, 0.34% from other races, and 2.90% from two or more races. Hispanic or Latino of any race were 0.55% of the population.

There were 526 households, out of which 44.1% had children under the age of 18 living with them, 62.7% were married couples living together, 10.1% had a female householder with no husband present, and 23.0% were non-families. 18.6% of all households were made up of individuals, and 3.8% had someone living alone who was 65 years of age or older.  The average household size was 2.76 and the average family size was 3.14.

In the township the population was spread out, with 31.0% under the age of 18, 9.0% from 18 to 24, 30.9% from 25 to 44, 21.8% from 45 to 64, and 7.3% who were 65 years of age or older.  The median age was 33 years. For every 100 females, there were 103.1 males.  For every 100 females age 18 and over, there were 96.7 males.

The median income for a household in the township was $40,595, and the median income for a family was $46,500. Males had a median income of $31,429 versus $21,019 for females. The per capita income for the township was $18,020.  About 5.8% of families and 8.8% of the population were below the poverty line, including 9.3% of those under age 18 and 6.8% of those age 65 or over.

References

External links
 Grant Valley Township official website
 United States National Atlas
 United States Census Bureau 2007 TIGER/Line Shapefiles
 United States Board on Geographic Names (GNIS)
 City-Data.com

Townships in Beltrami County, Minnesota
Townships in Minnesota